Andi Mack is an American family comedy-drama television series created by Terri Minsky that premiered on Disney Channel on April 7, 2017. It ran for three seasons and 57 episodes, concluding on July 26, 2019. The series stars Peyton Elizabeth Lee, Joshua Rush, Sofia Wylie, Asher Angel, Lilan Bowden, Lauren Tom, and Trent Garrett. It follows 13-year-old Andi Mack and her best friends, Cyrus Goodman and Buffy Driscoll, as they attend middle school.

Andi Mack is the top-rated series on cable television among children ages 6–14. It is the first series on Disney Channel to feature a gay main character, Cyrus Goodman, a distinction that has drawn considerable media attention and was reported in the news as "history". The series has been nominated for and won awards for his coming out storyline, the introduction of which caused a ratings surge.

Series overview

Episodes

Season 1 (2017)

Season 2 (2017–18)

Season 3 (2018–19)

References 

Lists of American children's television series episodes
Lists of American comedy-drama television series episodes
Lists of Disney Channel television series episodes